Ahmed Abdulsalam Azzaqa (Arabic: احمد عبدالسلام عزاقة; born 9 August 1988) is a Libyan professional footballer who plays as a goalkeeper for Libyan Premier League club Al-Madina and the Libya national team.

References 

1988 births
Living people

People from Sabha, Libya
Libyan footballers
Association football goalkeepers
Al-Hilal SC (Benghazi) players
Al-Madina SC players
Libyan Premier League players
Libya international footballers
Libya A' international footballers
2018 African Nations Championship players
2020 African Nations Championship players
2022 African Nations Championship players